Ciaran Dalton (born January 21, 2004) is an American soccer player who plays as a goalkeeper for USL Championship side New York Red Bulls II.

Club career
Daltan began his career with World Class FC before joining the academy of the New York Red Bulls in 2017. He made his professional debut for the Red Bulls' reserve side, New York Red Bulls II, on October 4, 2020 against Hartford Athletic. Dalton came on as a 71st minute substitute for Luca Lewis as New York Red Bulls II were defeated 0–2, Dalton conceding one of the goals.

Career statistics

Club

References

2004 births
Living people
American soccer players
Association football goalkeepers
New York Red Bulls II players
USL Championship players